St Augustine's Abbey was a Benedictine monastery in Canterbury, Kent, England. The abbey was founded in 598 and functioned as a monastery until its dissolution in 1538 during the English Reformation. After the abbey's dissolution, it underwent dismantlement until 1848. Since 1848, part of the site has been used for educational purposes (used as boarding houses and a library by The King's School, Canterbury) and the abbey ruins have been preserved for their historical value.

From founding until dissolution

In 597, Augustine arrived in England, having been sent by the missionary-minded Pope Gregory I to convert the Anglo-Saxons. The King of Kent at this time was Æthelberht or Ethelbert. Although he worshipped in a pagan temple just outside the walls of Canterbury to the east of the city, Ethelbert was married to a Christian, Bertha. According to tradition, the king not only gave his temple and its precincts to St Augustine for a church and monastery, he also ordered that the church to be erected be of "becoming splendour, dedicated to the blessed apostles Peter and Paul, and endowed it with a variety of gifts." One purpose of the foundation was to provide a residence for Augustine and his brother monks. As another, both King Ethelbert and Augustine foresaw the abbey as a burial place for abbots, archbishops, and kings of Kent.

William Thorne, the 14th-century chronicler of the abbey, records 598 as the year of the foundation. The monastic buildings were most likely wooden in the manner of Saxon construction, so they could be quickly built. However, building a church of solid masonry, like the churches Augustine had known in Rome, took longer. The church was completed and consecrated in 613. Ca. 624 a short distance to the east, Eadbald, son and successor of Ethelbert, founded a second church, dedicated to Saint Mary which also buried Kentish royalty. The abbey became known as St Augustine's after the founder's death.

For two centuries after its founding, St Augustine's was the only important religious house in the kingdom of Kent. The historian G. F. Maclear characterized St Augustine's as being a "missionary school" where "classical knowledge and English learning flourished". Over time, St Augustine's Abbey acquired an extensive library that included both religious and secular holdings. In addition, it had a scriptorium for producing manuscripts.

Dunstan's reform

Dunstan, Archbishop of Canterbury from 959 to 988, influenced a reorganisation of the abbey to conform to Benedictine rule. Buildings were enlarged and the church rebuilt. Dunstan also revised the dedication of the abbey, from the original Saints Peter and Paul, by adding Saint Augustine in 978. Since then, the abbey has been known as St Augustine's.

Invading Danes

The invading Danes not only spared St Augustine's, but in 1027 King Cnut made over all the possessions of Minster-in-Thanet to St Augustine's. These possessions included the preserved body of Saint Mildred. Belief in the miraculous power of this relic had spread throughout Europe, and it brought many pilgrims to St Augustine's, whose gifts enriched the abbey.

Norman conquest

Following the Norman Conquest of England in 1066, William the Conqueror confiscated landed estates, but he respected Church property. At St Augustine's Abbey, the Anglo-Saxon buildings were completely reconstructed in the form of a typical Norman Benedictine monastery. By 1100, all the original buildings had disappeared under a Romanesque edifice. There was further rebuilding as a result of the great fire in 1168. The fire's destruction accounts for the paucity of historical records for the preceding period.

From about 1250 onwards was a period of wealth in which "building succeeded building". Boggis' history calls this period a time of "worldly magnificence", marked by "lavish expenditures" on new buildings, royal visits, and banquets with thousands of guests. In addition, the papacy imposed many levies on the abbey. The large debt that was incurred by these expenditures might have swamped the abbey had it not been for generous benefactors who came to the rescue.

The cloister, frater (refectory) and kitchen were totally rebuilt. A new abbot's lodging and a great hall were added. In the early 14th century, land was acquired for a cellarer's range (living and working quarters for the cellarer who was responsible for provisioning the abbey's cellarium), a brewhouse, a bakehouse, and a new walled vineyard. A Lady chapel was built to the east of the church.

Fyndon’s Gate

The abbey gatehouse was rebuilt from 1301 to 1309 by Abbot Fyndon. It has since been known as the Fyndon Gate or the Great Gate. The chamber above the entrance was the state bed-chamber of the monastery. In 1625, Charles I of England and Queen Henrietta Maria slept in this chamber, following their marriage in Canterbury Cathedral. In 1660, after the Restoration, Charles II and his brothers, the Dukes of York and Gloucester, stayed in the gatehouse on their way to London.

Fyndon's gate suffered such damage by German bombs during the Second World War that it had to be rebuilt. The gate faces a small square known since the reign of Charles I as Lady Wootton's Green, after the widow of Edward, Lord Wootton of Marley who lived in the palace until her death in 1658. Statues of Æthelberht of Kent and Queen Bertha stand on the green.

St Anne's Chapel
In the 1360s, Juliana Leybourne funded the building of the "Countess's Chapel" or more usually "St Anne's Chapel" that was built on the side of the abbey. This was a small square chapel that had its own buttresses. Within the chapel was the tomb of the Abbot of Bourne who died in 1334 and the Abbot of Colwel who died in 1375. Leybourne was buried in the chapel. She gave the manor of Dene in Thanet to the abbey and a chantry to say daily prayers for her after her death.

Dissolution to present

Boggis describes the early 16th century leading up to the Dissolution of the Monasteries as "days of decadence". Although the abbey owned estates throughout Kent amounting to 19,862 acres, Boggis holds that "historical evidence proves conclusively that even if Henry VIII had never dissolved them, the English monasteries were already doomed." The "extortionate exactions" of the Papacy would lead to bankruptcy.

However, the English Reformation accompanied by the Dissolution of the Monasteries happened before bankruptcy. The Reformation replaced the Pope (a cleric) with a monarch (a layman). Actions by the Parliament's House of Commons strengthened the power of the laity versus the power of the clergy. These actions were part of the English Reformation’s "great transfer" of power, both economic and religious, from ecclesiastical to secular authorities.

As part of the "great transfer", Parliament gave King Henry VIII authority to dissolve the monasteries and confiscate the property for the Crown. The rationale given was "that the religious houses had ceased to apply their property to the specific religious uses for which it was originally given."

On 30 July 1538, the King's Commissioners arrived to take the surrender of St Augustine's Abbey. The last abbot and monks complied and left the abbey. The abbey, with its site, its goods, buildings, lands and all other possessions, became the property of the Crown. This dissolution ended over 940 years of monastic presence.

Dismantling

During the rest of Henry's reign, St Augustine's Abbey was held by the Crown with some of its buildings converted into a royal residence. However, in other parts of the abbey dismantling and sale of material began in 1541. Some of the stone was used in the fortifications of the Pale of Calais, but more of it was sold locally. The library, containing two thousand manuscripts, was destroyed and the treasure plundered.

The royal residence was occasionally used by the monarch as late as the reign of Queen Elizabeth I, during which the buildings were leased to a succession of noblemen. In 1564, Elizabeth leased the palace to Lord Cobham, and in September 1573 she visited Canterbury and lodged at her palace of St Augustine's. On 7 September, her birthday, she attended a ball at the Archbishop’s palace, returning at midnight to St Augustine's. Lord Cobham was a resident of Kent who had served her faithfully as a diplomat and parliamentarian.
On the attainder of Lord Cobham for treason in 1603 under the reign of James I, the residence was granted to Robert Cecil, Lord Essenden.

After Cecil died in 1612, James I and VI leased the palace to Edward, Lord Wootton of Marley (sometimes spelled "Wotton"), for a yearly rent of £20 13s and 4d. Wootton employed John Tradescant the Elder to lay out formal gardens. In 1618, King James granted a power for seven years to search for "treasure-trove, plate, jewels, copes, vestments, books, and the like, hid, or supposed to be hid, in abbeys, priories, monasteries, churches, chapels, and other places within the realm." As a result the Abbey was searched and some of the land around it was dug.

Wootton died in 1626, but Lady Wootton lived on in the palace until her death in 1658. The open space before the gateway is still known as Lady Wootton's Green.

Sir Edward Hales (1626–1684) took possession of the property after Lady Wootton’s death, to be followed by his son Sir Edward Hales (1645–1695). Rather than conserving the property, these new owners dismantled the buildings and carried used stones to build a new house at Hales Place.

From then on until 1844, the desolation continued until it had engulfed the church, cloister, kitchen, and refectory. Other parts of the site suffered degradation. From 1770 to 1844, the Alfred Beer & Company brewery operated within the abbey precincts. In 1804, a portion of the site was divided into lots and sold. The Great Court was used as a bowling green and skittle ground. Ethelbert's Tower, the remaining tower of the Norman abbey, was taken down in 1822. Robert Ewell, in his Guide to St. Augustine’s Monastery and Missionary College wrote that in the first half of the 19th century, the abbey "reached its lowest point of degradation".

Restoration to present

The condition of the abbey did not go unnoticed. In 1844 a rich young landowner, member of parliament, and generous churchman, Alexander James Beresford Hope, visited the ruins, found them deplorable, and bought them. Inspired by the missionary zeal of the Reverend Edward Coleridge, Hope and other donors gave additional money to restore and construct buildings for the establishment of a college to train young men as missionaries in the British colonies. They envisioned a dual purpose for the college: (a) to educate missionaries and (b) to excavate and preserve the abbey remains. St Augustine's Missionary College remained in existence until 1947. However, on the night of 31 May 1942, its buildings were so badly damaged by a German Blitz raid that the College ceased operations.

From 1952 to 1967, the Missionary College buildings were used as The Central College of the Anglican Communion.
From 1969 to 1976 the college was used by the theological department of King's College London as a base for final year ordination preparation.

Since 1976, the college buildings, together with some new ones, have been used by the King's School, Canterbury, for boarding houses and the school library. This part of the St Augustine's Abbey site was purchased by the school in 1994.

In 1940 the ruins of the abbey were taken into the care of the British government and are now managed by English Heritage. The Abbey is a UNESCO World Heritage Site

Ruins extant

Notable burials at the abbey 

Æthelberht of Kent, King of Kent, in the church of St Peter and St Paul. His shrine was later placed above the high altar of the Norman church
Eadbald of Kent, King of Kent, in the church of St Peter and St Paul
Theodore of Tarsus, Archbishop of Canterbury
Emma of Austrasia, consort of Eadbald, also in the church of St Peter and St Paul
Justus, first Bishop of Rochester, fourth Archbishop of Canterbury
Juliana Leybourne, Countess of Huntingdon, landowner and benefactor
Mellitus, saint, third Archbishop of Canterbury and the first Bishop of London

List of abbots
The following list is drawn from Edward Hasted, "The Abbey of St Augustine: Abbots", in The History and Topographical Survey of the County of Kent, Volume 12 (Canterbury, 1801), pp. 177–225. The start of an abbot's tenure is the earliest date known, be it election, confirmation or consecration, except where indicated. The end date of an abbot's tenure is his date of death unless otherwise noted.

Peter (598/605–607), appointed by the king, died en route to Francia
John (607–618), a companion of Augustine
Ruffinian (618–626), a companion of Augustine
Graciosus (626–638), a native of Rome and a companion of Augustine
Petronius (640–654), a native of Rome
Nathaniel (655–667), a companion of Mellitus and Justus
Adrian (–708), a native of Africa, did not arrive in England until 673
Benedict Biscop acted as abbot during 669–671
Albinus (708–732), an Englishman and disciple of Adrian
Nothbarld (732–748), a monk of the abbey
Aldhune (748–760)
Jænberht (760–762), became archbishop of Canterbury
Ethelnod (762–787)
Guttard (d. 803)
Cunred (803–822), a relative of King Cuthred of Kent
Wernod (d. 844), a relative of King Cuthred
Diernod (d. 864)
Wynhere (d. 866)
Beadmund (d. 874)
Kynebert (d. 879)
Etaus (d. 883)
Degmund (d. 886)
Alfrid (d. 894)
Ceolbert (d. 902)
Beccan (d. 907)
Athelwald (d. 909)
Gilbert (d. 917)
Edred (917)
Alchmund (d. 928)
Guttulf (d. 935)
Eadred (d. 937)
Lulling (d. 939)
Beornelm (d. 942)
Sigeric (d. 956)
Alfric (d. 971)
Elfnoth (d. 980)
Sigeric (980–989), became archbishop of Canterbury
Wulfric the Elder (990–1006)
Elmer (1006–1022), became bishop of Sherborne
Ælfstan (1022–1044/47)
Wulfric the Younger (1044/47–1059/61), sent to Rome on royal business in 1056
Egelsin (1059/61–1070), a monk of Winchester, fled his abbey after the Norman conquest
Scotland or Scoland (1070–1087), a Norman made abbot by the king
Wido (1087–1099)
Hugh I of Fleury (d. 26 March 1124), a Norman
Hugh II of Trottiscliffe (1125 – 25 June 1151), a monk of Rochester, election confirmed by cardinal-legate John of Crema
Sylvester (1152–1161), prior, went to Rome to have his election confirmed by the pope, was later excommunicated and deposed by the archbishop, but restored before his death
Clarembald (1163–1173/76), a layman appointed by the king, deposed
Roger (1176 – 20 October 1212), went to Tusculum to be consecrated by the pope
Alexander le Pargiter (1212 – 4 October 1220), went to Rome to be consecrated by the pope
Hugh III (26 August 1220 – 3 November 1224), chamberlain of the monastery, went to Rome to be consecrated by the pope (1 April 1221)
Robert de Bathel (24 November 1224 – 16 January 1252), treasurer of the monastery, went to Rome to receive consecration from Cardinal Pelagius of Albano (1225)
Roger de Chichester (3 February 1253 – 13 December 1272)
Nicholas Thorn or de Spina (2 January 1273 – 1283), consecrated at Rome (Easter 1273) and later resigned in Rome
Thomas de Fyndon (1283 – 16 February 1309), prior
Ralph Bourn (7 March 1309 – 3 February 1334), went to Avignon for consecration (30 June 1309)
Thomas Poney (1 March 1334 – 13 September 1343), went to Avignon for consecration (12 June 1334)
William Drulege (2 October 1343 – 11 September 1346), chamberlain
John Devenisse, appointed by the pope in 1346
Thomas Colwelle (October 1349 – 29 May 1375), appointed by the pope
Michael Peckham (d. 11 February 1386), chamberlain
William Welde (28 February 1389 – 12 June 1405), doctor of canon law
Thomas Hunden (6 May 1405 – 17 August 1420)
Marcellus Dandelyon, abbot in 1426
John Hawkherst
George Pensherst, prior, confirmed by the king on 27 February 1430 and still abbot in 1450
James Sevenock, elected in 1457
William Selling (d. 1480), resigned?
John (d. 1497)
John Dygon (17 February 1497 – 1509), uncle of the composer John Dygon
Thomas Hampton, confirmed by the king on 21 July 1509
John Hawkins, abbot in 1511
John Foche or John Essex ( – 30 July 1538), surrendered the monastery to the crown during the Dissolution of the Monasteries

See also
 List of monastic houses in Kent
 List of monastic houses in England
 St Augustine's Conduit House

References

External links

 at English Heritage
 https://archive.org/details/StAugustinesCanterbury-centralCollegeOfTheAnglicanCommunion A brochure about St Augustine’s as the Central College of the Anglican Communion.
 https://archive.org/details/StAugustinesCanterburyAStoryOfEnduringLife A booklet written by Canon W. F. France, the last warden of St Augustine’s Missionary College.

 History of St Augustine's abbey

Churches completed in 598
Christian monasteries established in the 6th century
Augustine
Anglo-Saxon sites in England
Archaeological sites in Kent
Augustine
English Heritage sites in Kent
Monasteries in Kent
World Heritage Sites in England
Buildings and structures in Canterbury
Benedictine monasteries in England
Grade I listed buildings in Kent
Gregorian mission
Religious museums in England
Museums in Canterbury
Ruins in Kent
6th-century establishments in England
1538 disestablishments in England
Ruined abbeys and monasteries
Burial sites of the House of Kent
Monasteries dissolved under the English Reformation
6th-century churches